Peter McPherson (born 18 June 1984) is an Australian footballer who plays for NewFM side West Wallsend.

Career
Born in the New South Wales metropolitan area of Newcastle, McPherson made one appearance for A-League side the Newcastle Jets, coming on as a second-half substitute in the 5–1 defeat to Perth Glory in October 2005. He then moved to Sydney Olympic FC on loan, and returned to the Newcastle Jets after his loan finished. McPherson then moved permanently to Sydney Olympic FC, where he played during the 2007 season. In 2008, he moved to study Physical Education in the United States at Michigan State University. He rejoined Sydney Olympic FC in January 2009. and played his first game after returning to Sydney on 2 February 2009 against West Sydney Berries.

Privates
Outside of football, McPherson works as a Physical Education teacher. His other interests include tennis, golf and cricket.

References

External links
 Profile at OZ Football

1984 births
Living people
Association football midfielders
Australian soccer players
A-League Men players
National Soccer League (Australia) players
Newcastle Jets FC players
Sydney Olympic FC players
National Premier Leagues players